Lithobatrachus is an extinct genus of prehistoric amphibian. It was described in 1929 by Hampton Wildman Parker based on a poorly preserved specimen that was first described as Hyla europaea by Gladwyn Kingsley Noble the year before. The two engaged in a debate whether the new genus was warranted. It might belong to the family Palaeobatrachidae, but this remains ambiguous.

See also

 Prehistoric amphibian
 List of prehistoric amphibians

References

Prehistoric frogs
Oligocene animals of Europe
Fossil taxa described in 1929
Taxa named by Hampton Wildman Parker